Brian Baloyi (born 16 March 1974 in Alexandra, Gauteng) is a retired South African association football goalkeeper.

Baloyi made his professional debut in 1993. He joined league rivals Mamelodi Sundowns in 2004 after playing for Kaizer Chiefs for over a decade. He is commonly nicknamed "Spiderman".

International career 
Baloyi made his debut against the Netherlands on 4 June 1997. In the match, which ended in a 2-0 loss for the Bafana Bafana, he witnessed a long-range goal by Giovanni van Bronckhorst. He played for South Africa national football team and was in part of the squad that travelled to Saudi Arabia for the 1997 FIFA Confederations Cup where he played their final match of the group stage in a 4–3 loss against Uruguay. He also played in the 1998 Africa Cup of Nations, the 1998 FIFA World Cup and the 2000 Summer Olympics.

Despite retirement claims, Baloyi was called up by Joel Santana for the 2009 FIFA Confederations Cup but he was just Santana's third choice behind Itumeleng Khune and Rowen Fernandez.

Personal life 
Baloyi's wife, Phungi, is a breast cancer survivor. She was one of the mourners at the funeral of the wife of Lucas Radebe, Feziwe, who were handed pink ribbons to wear to raise awareness of cancer. He has a son named Kgosi.

References

External links 
 
 

1974 births
Living people
People from Alexandra, Gauteng
Tsonga people
South African soccer players
Association football goalkeepers
1998 African Cup of Nations players
2002 African Cup of Nations players
1997 FIFA Confederations Cup players
1998 FIFA World Cup players
2009 FIFA Confederations Cup players
Footballers at the 2000 Summer Olympics
Olympic soccer players of South Africa
Kaizer Chiefs F.C. players
Mamelodi Sundowns F.C. players
South Africa international soccer players
Sportspeople from Gauteng